Mason County Schools is a school district headquartered in Point Pleasant, West Virginia. It is within Mason County, West Virginia.

Schools
 Secondary schools
 Hannan Junior/Senior High School
 Point Pleasant Junior/Senior High School
 Wahama Junior/Senior High School
 Primary schools
 Ashton Elementary School
 Beale Elementary School
 Leon Elementary School
 New Haven Elementary School
 Point Pleasant Primary School
 Point Pleasant Intermediate School
 Roosevelt Elementary School
 Other   
 Mason County Career Center

References

External links
 Mason County Schools
Education in Mason County, West Virginia
School districts in West Virginia